The April Fools is a 1969 American romantic comedy film directed by Stuart Rosenberg and starring Jack Lemmon and Catherine Deneuve.

Plot
Wall Street broker Howard Brubaker is married to Phyllis, who does not love him. Catherine is the stunning French wife of an equally uncaring husband, Howard's philandering boss, Ted Gunther.

The evening of the day Ted promotes Howard, Howard attends Ted's house party where Ted urges him to pick up an available woman there and proceeds to show him how. Howard reluctantly tries it on Catherine, who instantly accepts. The two leave the party and go out for a little adventure on the town. Ted is oblivious, as he is concentrating on other women at the party.

The two find their marriages are loveless as they discover more about each other that night and decide to run away together the next evening. However, Ted does not realize the other man is Howard until Howard and Catherine are about to board the plane to Paris.

Cast

Production
The female lead was originally going to be played by Shirley MacLaine, but she was not available due to commitments on Sweet Charity and campaigning for Robert F. Kennedy. Catherine Deneuve was cast instead.  On 22 July 1968, filming began in New York City. On 23 October 1968, Variety announced filming completion.

Reception
A reviewer for The New York Times wrote that the film "manipulates its stereotypes with elegance and style. ... The best things in the movie, however, are the extraordinarily good supporting performances by Peter Lawford (Miss Deneuve's husband), Jack Weston, Harvey Korman, Sally Kellerman, and by two stars who invented movie elegance almost 30 years ago, Charles Boyer and Myrna Loy."

Paperback novelization
Published slightly in advance of the film's release (as was the usual custom of the era), a paperback screenplay novelization by the ubiquitous and gifted tie-in scribe William Johnston was issued by Popular Library.

Home media
The April Fools was released on DVD by CBS Home Entertainment through Paramount Home Media Distribution on January 28, 2014, as a Region 1 Widescreen DVD.

See also
 List of American films of 1969

References

External links
 
 
 
 
 

1969 films
1969 comedy-drama films
1969 romantic comedy films
1960s American films
1960s English-language films
1960s romantic comedy-drama films
American romantic comedy-drama films
Cinema Center Films films
Films about infidelity
Films directed by Stuart Rosenberg
Films produced by Gordon Carroll
Films scored by Marvin Hamlisch
Films set in New York City
Films shot in New York City